Pro Veritate was a Christian independent monthly journal published in South Africa by the Christian Institute of Southern Africa from 1962 to 1977. 

Articles reflected a theological and Christian point of view on a wide range of topics during the Apartheid era of South Africa. The journal was banned by the South African Government on 19 October 1977 under the Internal Security Act of South Africa.

References

1962 establishments in South Africa
1972 disestablishments in South Africa
Christian magazines
Defunct magazines published in South Africa
Independent magazines
Magazines established in 1962
Magazines disestablished in 1972
Monthly magazines published in South Africa